Tomas Vaitkus (born 4 February 1982) is a Lithuanian professional road racing cyclist riding for UCI Continental team .
Vaitkus, nicknamed Tomas the Tank Engine, made his Tour de France debut in the 2007 edition but had to abandon after a serious crash at the end of stage two.  announced that he would be joining the team in 2010. He rejoined Astana in 2011. On 29 August 2011, it was announced that Vaitkus would join  for its inaugural season in 2012.

Major results

2000
 World Junior Track Championships
1st  Team pursuit
2nd  Individual pursuit
2001
 European Under-23 Track Championships
2nd  Team pursuit
3rd  Individual pursuit
2002
 1st  Time trial, UCI Road World Under-23 Championships
2003
 1st  National Time Trial Championships
 1st Stage 5 Danmark Rundt
2004
 1st  National Road Race Championships
 1st  National Time Trial Championships
 1st Stage 5 Danmark Rundt
2005
 1st Grand Prix Ühispanga Tartu
 2nd Scheldeprijs
 4th Overall Danmark Rundt
2006
 1st Stage 9 Giro d'Italia
2007
 3rd Overall Volta ao Algarve
 6th Tour of Flanders
2008
 1st  National Road Race Championships
 1st Ronde van het Groene Hart
 2nd Trofeo Calvià
 3rd Overall Volta ao Algarve
1st Stage 2
 6th Trofeo Cala Millor
 8th Overall Volta ao Distrito de Santarém
2011
 9th Overall Three Days of De Panne
2013
 1st  National Road Race Championships
 1st Stage 5 Tour de Azerbaijan
2015
 1st Vilnius Velomarathon
 10th Overall Tour of Taihu Lake
2016
 1st  Overall Tour de Constantine
 1st Grand Prix de la Ville d'Oran
 2nd National Road Race Championships
 3rd Overall Tour International de Sétif
1st  Points classification
1st Stages 1 & 4
 3rd Overall Tour Internationale d'Oranie
1st  Points classification
1st Stage 1
 4th Critérium International de Sétif

References

External links

Palmares on Trap-Friis

1982 births
Living people
Lithuanian male cyclists
Cyclists at the 2004 Summer Olympics
Olympic cyclists of Lithuania
Lithuanian Giro d'Italia stage winners
Sportspeople from Klaipėda
Lithuanian track cyclists